This is a list of 103 species in Nysson, a genus of hymenopterans in the family Crabronidae.

Nysson species

 Nysson aequalis Vahl i c g b
 Nysson alicantinus Mercet, 1909 i c g
 Nysson amurensis Nemkov, 1990 i c g
 Nysson argenteofasciatus Radoszkowski, 1877 i c g
 Nysson argenticus R. Bohart, 1968 i c g
 Nysson aridulus R. Bohart, 1968 i c g
 Nysson aurinotus Say, 1837 i c g
 Nysson bakeri R. Bohart, 1968 i c g
 Nysson barrei Radoszkowski, 1893 i c g
 Nysson basalis F. Smith, 1856 c g
 Nysson braunsii Handlirsch, 1900 i c g
 Nysson carinifrons Nemkov, 1995 i c g
 Nysson castaneus Radoszkowski, 1877 i c g
 Nysson castellanus Mercet, 1909 i c g
 Nysson chevrieri Kohl, 1879 i c g
 Nysson chiengmaiensis Tsuneki, 1963 i c g
 Nysson chumash Pate, 1940 i c g
 Nysson compactus Cresson, 1882 i c g
 Nysson costae Handlirsch, 1901 i c g
 Nysson daeckei Viereck, 1904 i c g
 Nysson decemmaculatus Spinola, 1807 i c g
 Nysson dimidiatus Jurine, 1807 i c g
 Nysson doriae Gribodo, 1884 i c g
 Nysson dubius Olivier, 1812 i c g
 Nysson dusmeti Mercet, 1909 i c g
 Nysson dutti R. Turner, 1917 i c g
 Nysson epeoliformis F. Smith, 1856 i c g
 Nysson erythropoda Cameron, 1890 i c g
 Nysson euphorbiae R. Bohart, 1968 i c g
 Nysson excavatus R. Turner, 1914 i c g
 Nysson fidelis Cresson, 1882 i c g
 Nysson fraternus Mercet, 1909 i c g
 Nysson freyigessneri  b
 Nysson fulvipes A. Costa, 1859 i c g
 Nysson fulviventris Tsuneki, 1971 i c g
 Nysson gagates Bradley, 1920 i c g
 Nysson ganglbaueri Kohl, 1912 i c g
 Nysson gerstaeckeri Handlirsch, 1887 i c g
 Nysson grandissimus Radoszkowski, 1877 i c g
 Nysson guichardi de Beaumont, 1967 i c g
 Nysson handlirschi Schmiedeknecht, 1896 i c g
 Nysson harveyi de Beaumont, 1967 i c g
 Nysson hesperus R. Bohart, 1968 i c g
 Nysson hrubanti Balthasar, 1972 i c g
 Nysson humilis Handlirsch, 1895 i c g
 Nysson ibericus Handlirsch, 1895 i c g
 Nysson inornatus de Beaumont, 1967 i c g
 Nysson intermedius Viereck, 1908 i c g
 Nysson interruptus (Fabricius, 1798) i c g
 Nysson kazenasi Nemkov and Gayubo, 2003 i c g
 Nysson kolazyi Handlirsch, 1887 i c g
 Nysson konowi Mercet, 1909 i c g
 Nysson laevis Pulawski, 1964 i c g
 Nysson lapillus de Beaumont, 1965 i c g
 Nysson lateralis Packard, 1867 i c g b
 Nysson laufferi Mercet, 1904 i c g
 Nysson maculosus (Gmelin, 1790) i c g
 Nysson maderae (R. Bohart, 1968) i c g
 Nysson miegi Mercet, 1909 i c g
 Nysson militaris Gerstäcker, 1867 i c g
 Nysson mimulus Valkeila, 1964 i c g
 Nysson minutus Arnold, 1929 i c g
 Nysson monachus Mercet, 1909 i c g
 Nysson nanus Handlirsch, 1898 i c g
 Nysson neorusticus R. Bohart, 1968 i c g
 Nysson niger Chevrier, 1868 i c g
 Nysson ohli (Schmid-Egger, 2011) i c g
 Nysson paralias Standfuss, 2010 i c g
 Nysson parietalis Mercet, 1909 i c g
 Nysson plagiatus Günther, 1861 i c g b
 Nysson pratensis Mercet, 1909 i c g
 Nysson pumilus Cresson, 1882 i c g
 Nysson pusillus de Beaumont, 1953 i c g
 Nysson quadricolor Arnold, 1951 i c g
 Nysson quadriguttatus Spinola, 1807 i c g
 Nysson recticornis Bradley, 1920 i c g b
 Nysson roubali Zavadil, 1937 i c g
 Nysson rufiventris Cresson, 1882 i c g
 Nysson rufoflavus R. Bohart, 1968 i c g
 Nysson rufoniger R. Turner, 1912 i c g
 Nysson rufopictus F. Smith, 1856 i c g
 Nysson rufus Handlirsch, 1895 i c g
 Nysson rugosus Cameron, 1890 i c g
 Nysson ruspolii von Schulthess, 1893 i c g
 Nysson rusticus Cresson, 1882 i c g b
 Nysson ruthenicus Birula, 1912 i c g
 Nysson schlingeri R. Bohart, 1968 i c g
 Nysson schmiedeknechtii Handlirsch, 1900 i c g
 Nysson semenovi (Nemkov, 2001) i c g
 Nysson sexguttatus Gussakovskij, 1952 i c g
 Nysson simplicicornis W. Fox, 1896 i c g
 Nysson spinosus (J. Forster, 1771) i c g
 Nysson subtilis W. Fox, 1896 i c g b
 Nysson timberlakei R. Bohart, 1968 i c g
 Nysson trichopygus de Beaumont, 1967 i c g
 Nysson trichrus (Mickel, 1916) i c g
 Nysson tridens Gerstäcker, 1867 i c g
 Nysson trimaculatus (Rossi, 1790) i c g
 Nysson tristis Cresson, 1882 i c g b
 Nysson uniformis Pérez, 1895 i c g
 Nysson varelai Mercet, 1909 i c g
 Nysson variabilis Chevrier, 1867 i c g
 Nysson willowmorensis Brauns, 1911 i c g

Data sources: i = ITIS, c = Catalogue of Life, g = GBIF, b = Bugguide.net

References

Nysson